A road train, land train or long combination vehicle (LCV) is a trucking vehicle used to move road freight more efficiently than semi-trailer trucks. It consists of two or more trailers or semi-trailers hauled by a prime mover.

History 
Early road trains consisted of traction engines pulling multiple wagons. The first identified road trains operated into South Australia's Flinders Ranges from the Port Augusta area in the mid-19th century. They displaced bullock teams for the carriage of minerals to port and were, in turn, superseded by railways.

During the Crimean War, a traction engine was used to pull multiple open trucks. By 1898 steam traction engine trains with up to four wagons were employed in military manoeuvres in England.

In 1900, John Fowler & Co. provided armoured road trains for use by the British Armed Forces in the Second Boer War. Lord Kitchener stated that he had around 45 steam road trains at his disposal.

A road train devised by Captain Charles Renard of the French Engineering Corps was displayed at the 1903 Paris Salon. After his death, Daimler, which had acquired the rights, attempted to market it in the United Kingdom. Four of these vehicles were successfully delivered to Queensland, Australia, before the company ceased production upon the start of World War I.

In the 1930s/40s, the government of Australia operated an AEC Roadtrain to transport freight and supplies into the Northern Territory, replacing the Afghan camel trains that had been trekking through the deserts since the late 19th century. This truck pulled two or three  Dyson four-axle self-tracking trailers. At , the AEC was grossly underpowered by today's standards, and drivers and offsiders (a partner or assistant) routinely froze in winter and sweltered in summer due to the truck's open cab design and the position of the engine radiator, with its  cooling fan, behind the seats.

Australian Kurt Johannsen, a bush mechanic, is recognised as the inventor of the modern road train. After transporting stud bulls  to an outback property, Johannsen was challenged to build a truck to carry 100 head of cattle instead of the original load of 20. Provided with financing of about 2000 pounds and inspired by the tracking abilities of the Government roadtrain, Johannsen began construction. Two years later his first road train was running.

Johannsen's first road train consisted of a United States Army World War II surplus Diamond-T tank carrier, nicknamed "Bertha", and two home-built self-tracking trailers. Both wheel sets on each trailer could steer, and therefore could negotiate the tight and narrow tracks and creek crossings that existed throughout Central Australia in the earlier part of the 20th century. Freighter Trailers in Australia viewed this improved invention and went on to build self-tracking trailers for Kurt and other customers, and went on to become innovators in transport machinery for Australia.

This first example of the modern road train, along with the AEC Government Roadtrain, forms part of the huge collection at the National Road Transport Hall of Fame in Alice Springs, Northern Territory.

Usage

Australia 

The term road train is used in Australia. In contrast with a more common semi-trailer towing one trailer or semi-trailer, the prime mover of a road train hauls two or more trailers or semi-trailers. They transport freight across some of the harshest environments on Earth.

Double (two-trailer) road train combinations are allowed on some roads in most states of Australia, including specified approaches to the ports and industrial areas of Adelaide, South Australia and Perth, Western Australia. A double road train should not be confused with a B-double, which is allowed access to most of the country and in all major cities.

Triple (three-trailer) road trains operate in western New South Wales, western Queensland, South Australia, Western Australia and the Northern Territory, with the last three states also allowing AB-quads (B double with two additional trailers coupled behind). Darwin is the only capital city in the world where triples and quads are allowed to within  of the central business district (CBD).

Strict regulations regarding licensing, registration, weights, and experience apply to all operators of road trains throughout Australia.

Road trains are used for transporting all manner of materials: common examples are livestock, fuel, mineral ores, and general freight. Their cost-effective transport has played a significant part in the economic development of remote areas; some communities are totally reliant on regular service.

The multiple dog-trailers are unhooked, the dollies removed and then connected individually to multiple trucks at "assembly" yards when the road train gets close to populated areas.

When the flat-top trailers of a road train need to be transported empty, it is common practice to stack them. This is commonly referred to as "doubled-up" or "doubling-up". Sometimes, if many trailers are required to be moved at one time, they will be triple-stacked, or "tripled-up".

Higher Mass Limits (HML) Schemes are now in all jurisdictions in Australia, allowing trucks to carry additional weight beyond general mass limits.

United States 

In the United States, trucks on public roads are limited to two trailers (two  and a dolly to connect; the limit is  end to end). Some states allow three  trailers, although triples are usually restricted to less populous states such as Idaho, Oregon, and Montana, plus the Ohio Turnpike and Indiana East–West Toll Road. Triples are used for long-distance less-than-truckload freight hauling (in which case the trailers are shorter than a typical single-unit trailer) or resource hauling in the interior west (such as ore or aggregate). Triples are sometimes marked with "LONG LOAD" banners both front and rear. "Turnpike doubles"—tractors towing two full-length trailers—are allowed on the New York Thruway and Massachusetts Turnpike (Interstate 90), Florida's Turnpike, Kansas Turnpike (Kansas City - Wichita route) as well as the Ohio and Indiana toll roads. Colorado allows what are known as "Rocky Mountain Doubles" which is one full length  trailer and an additional  trailer. The term "road train" is not commonly used in the United States; "turnpike train" has been used, generally in a pejorative sense.

In the western United States LCVs are allowed on many Interstate highways. The only LCVs allowed nationwide are STAA doubles.

Europe 

In Finland, a length of  has been allowed since January 2019, although the longest vehicles measure , because of cornering regulations.

The Scandinavian countries are less densely populated than the other EU countries, and distances, especially in Finland and Sweden, are long. Until the late 1960s, vehicle length was unlimited, giving rise to long vehicles to cost effectively handle goods. As traffic increased, truck lengths became more of a concern and they were limited, albeit at a more generous level than in the rest of Europe.

Testing of the special lorry was limited to a predefined route in northern Finland

In 2020, a small number of road trains were operating between Belgium and the Netherlands.

Mexico 
For Mexico the road trains exist in a very small form due to the highway sizes and streets in the principal cities, and there are only permitted 2 trailers joined with a pup or dolly created for this purpose, recently the regulations tend to be more severe and strict to avoid overloading and frequent accident chance, to adhere to the federal rules of transportation. Truck drivers must obtain a certificate to certify that the driver is capable to manipulate and drive that type of vehicle.

All the tractor vehicles that make road train type transport in the country (along with the normal security requirements) need to have visual warnings like...

 "Precaucion Doble Semirremolque" alert (Warning Double Semi-Trailer) located in the frontal fenders of the tractor and in the rear part of each trailer.
 Some yellow turning lights of warning to be more visible to another drivers on the road
 a Seal for the entire vehicle approving the use as Double Semi Trailer.
 Federal License plates in every trailer, dolly, and Tractor unit

Some major cargo enterprises in the country use this form to cut costs of carrying all type of goods in some regions where another form of transportation are so expensive to improve it due to the difficult geography of the country.

The Mexican road train equivalent form in Australian Standard is the A-Double form, the difference is that the Mexican road trains can be hauled with a long distance tractor truck.

Zimbabwe

In Zimbabwe, they are only used in one highway, Ngezi - Makwiro road. They make use of 42m long road trains pulling 3 trailers.

Trailer arrangements

A-double

An A-double consists of a prime mover towing a normal lead trailer with a ball hitch (or some other type of coupling) affixed to it at the rear. A fifth wheel dolly is then affixed to the hitch allowing another standard trailer to be attached. Eleven-axle coal tipping sets carrying to Port Kembla, Australia are described as A-doubles. The set depicted has a tare weight of 35.5 tonne and is capable of carrying 50 tonne of coal. Note the shield at the front of the second trailer to direct tipped coal from the first trailer downwards.

Pros include the ability to use standard semi-trailers and the potential for very large loads. Cons mainly include very tricky reversing due to the multiple articulation points across two different types of coupling.

B-double

A B-double consists of a prime mover towing a specialised lead trailer that has a fifth-wheel mounted on the rear towing another semi-trailer, resulting in two articulation points. It may also be known as a B-train, interlink in South Africa, B-double in Australia, tandem tractor-trailer, tandem rig or double in North America. The fifth wheel coupling is located at the rear of the lead (first) trailer and is mounted on a "tail" section commonly located immediately above the lead trailer axles. In North America this area of the lead trailer is often referred to as the "bridge". The twin-trailer assembly is hooked up to a tractor unit via the tractor unit's fifth wheel in the customary manner.

An advantage of the B-train configuration is its inherent stability when compared to most other twin trailer combinations, the turntable mounted on the forward trailer results in the B-train not requiring a converter dolly as with all other road train configurations. It is this feature above all else that has ensured its continued development and global acceptance. Reversing is simpler as all articulation points are on fifth wheel couplings.

B-train trailers are used to transport many types of load and examples include tanks for liquid and dry-bulk, flat-beds and curtain-siders for deck-loads, bulkers for aggregates and wood residuals, refrigerated trailers for chilled and frozen goods, vans for dry goods, logging trailers for forestry work and cattle liners for livestock.

In Australia, standard semi-trailers are permitted on almost any road. B-doubles are more heavily regulated, but routes are made available by state governments for almost anywhere that significant road freight movement is required.

Around container ports in Australia exists what is known as a super B-double; a B-double with an extra axle (total of 4) on the lead trailer and either three or four axle set on the rear trailer. This allows the super B-Double to carry combinations of two 40 foot containers, four 20 foot containers, or a combination of one 40 foot container and two twenty foot containers. However, because of their length and low accessibility into narrow streets, these vehicles are restricted in where they can go and are generally used for terminal-to-terminal work, i.e. wharf to container holding park or wharf-to-wharf. The rear axle on each trailer can also pivot slightly while turning to prevent scrubbing out the edges of the tyres due to the heavy loads placed on them.

B-triple

Same as B-double, but with an additional lead trailer behind the prime mover. The B-train principle has been exploited in Australia, where configurations such as B triples, double-B doubles and 2AB quads are permitted on some routes. These are run in most states of Australia where double road trains are allowed. Australia's National Transport Commission proposed a national framework for B-triple operations that includes basic vehicle specifications and operating conditions that the commission anticipates will replace the current state-by-state approach, which largely discourages the use of B-triples for interstate operation.

AB triple

An AB triple consists of a standard trailer with a B-Double behind it using a converter dolly, with a trailer order of Standard, Dolly, B-Train, Standard. The final trailer may be either a B-Train with no trailer attached to it or a standard trailer. Alternatively, a BA triple sees this configuration reversed, consisting of a B-double with a converter dolly and standard trailer behind it.

A-triple

BAB quad
A BAB quad consists of two B-double units linked with a converter dolly, with trailer order of Prime Mover, B-Train, Dolly, B-Train.

C-train
A C-train is a semi-trailer attached to a fifth-wheel on a C-dolly. Unlike in an A-Train, the C-dolly is connected to the tractor or another trailer in front of it with two drawbars, thus eliminating the drawbar connection as an articulation point. One of the axles on a C-dolly is self-steerable to prevent tire scrubbing. C-dollies are not permitted in Australia, due to the lack of articulation.

Dog-trailer (dog trailer)

A dog-trailer (also called a pup) is any trailer that is hooked to a converter dolly, with a single A-frame drawbar that fits into the Ringfeder or pintle hook on the rear of the trailer in front, giving the whole unit three to five articulation points and very little roll stiffness.

Interstate road transport registration in Australia
In 1991, at a special Premiers' Conference, Australian heads of government signed an inter-governmental agreement to establish a national heavy vehicle registration, regulation and charging scheme, otherwise known as FIRS.

This registration scheme is known as the Federal Interstate Registration Scheme. The requirements of the scheme were as follows:

If the vehicle was purchased to be used for interstate trade, no stamp duty was payable on the purchase price of the vehicle.

The vehicle had to be subjected to an annual inspection for roadworthy standards, which had to be passed before registration could be renewed.

With the registration identification; the first letter of the 6 digit identified the home state: W, Western Australia; S, South Australia; V, Victoria; N, New South Wales; Q, Queensland; T, Tasmania; A, Australian Capital Territory and C, Northern Territory.

Due to the 'eastern' and 'western' mass limits in Australia, two different categories of registration were enacted. The second digit of the registration plate showed what mass limit was allowed for that vehicle. If a vehicle had a 'V' as the second letter, its mass limits were in line with the eastern states mass limits, which were:

 Steer axle, 1 axle, 2 tyres: 
 Steer axle, 2 axles, 2 tyres per axle: Non load sharing suspension 
 Load sharing suspension 
 Single axle, dual tyres: 
 Tandem axle, dual tyres: 
 Tri-axle, dual tyres or 'super single' tyres: 
 Gross combination mass on a 6-axle vehicle not to exceed 

If a vehicle had an X as the second letter, its mass limits were in line with the western states mass limits, which were:
 Steer axle, 1 axle, 2 tyres: 
 Steer axle, 2 axles, 2 tyres per axle
 Non load sharing suspension : Load sharing suspension 
 Single axle, dual tyres: 
 Tandem axle, dual tyres: 
 Tri-axle, dual tyres or "super single" tyres: 
 Gross combination mass on a 6-axle vehicle not to exceed 

The second digit of the registration being a T designates a trailer.

One of the main criteria of the registration was that intrastate operation was not permitted. The load had to come from one state and be delivered to another state or territory. Many grain carriers were reported and prosecuted for cartage from the paddock to the silos. If, though, they went to a port silo, they were given the benefit of the doubt, as that grain was more than likely going overseas.

Signage

In the case of B-triples in Western Australia, they are signed front and rear with "ROAD TRAIN" until they cross the WA/SA border where they are then signed with "LONG VEHICLE" in the front and rear.

Converter dollies must have a sign affixed horizontally to the rearmost point, complying to the same conditions, reading "LONG VEHICLE". This is required for when a dolly is towed behind a trailer.

Combination lengths
B-double  max. Western Australia,  max.
B-triple up to  max.
NTC modular B-triple  max. (uses 2× conventional B-double lead trailers)
Pocket road train  max. (Western Australia only) This configuration is classed as a "Long Vehicle".
Double road train or AB road train  max.
Triple and ABB or BAB-quad road trains  max.

Operating weights
Operational weights are based on axle group masses, as follows:
Single axle (steer tyre) 
Single axle (steer axle with 'super single' tyres) 
Single axle (dual tyres) 
Tandem axle grouping 
Tri-axle grouping 

Therefore, 

Speed limits

World's longest road trains

Below is a list of longest road trains driven in the world. Most of these had no practical use, as they were put together and driven across relatively short distances for the express purpose of record-breaking.

In 1989, a trucker named "Buddo" tugged 12 trailers down the main street of Winton.
In 1993, "Plugger" Bowden took the record with a  Mack CLR pulling 16 trailers.
In April 1994 Bob Hayward and Andrew Aichison organised another attempt using a 1988 Mack Super-Liner 500 hp V8 belonging to Plugger Bowden who drove 29 stock trailers measuring 439.169 metres a distance of 4.5 km into Bourke. The record was published in the next Guinness Book of Records. 
Then the record went back to Winton with 34 trailers.
In 1999, the town of Merredin, officially made it into the Guinness Book of Records, when Marleys Transport made a successful attempt on the record for the world's longest road train.
The record nearly didn't fall, as the first prime mover's main driveshaft broke when taking off.
It was on the main road of Clifton, Queensland, that 70-year-old John Atkinson claimed a new record, pulled by a tri-drive Mack Titan.

Outside Australia 
On 12 April 2016 in Gothenburg, Sweden, a Volvo FH16 750 pulled 20 trailers with double-stacked containers with a total length of 300 meters (984 ft) and with a total weight of 750 tonnes.

Gallery

See also 

 Air brake (road vehicle)
 Articulated bus
 Brake
 B-train
 Containerization
 Container on barge
 Container ship
 Dolly (trailer)
 Federal Bridge Weight Formula
 Fifth wheel coupling
 Gladhand connector
 Intermodal freight transport
 Jackknifing
 Longer Heavier Vehicle
 National Network – highway and interstate system
 Overland train
 Ringfeder coupling devices
 Road transport in Australia
 Rolling highway – freight trucks by rail
 Semi-trailer truck – large trucks such as road trains and articulated lorries
 Shipping container
 Top intermodal container companies list
 Trackless train
 Transport

References

External links

 Australian Road Train Association
 Australian National Heavy Vehicles Accreditation Scheme.
 Northern Territory Road Train road safety TV commercials. 
 South Australian Roads road train gazette
 NSW Roads and Traffic Authority road train operators gazette
 NSW Roads and Traffic Authority Restricted Access Vehicles route map index
 NSW Roads and Traffic Authority Reflective sign standards
 U.S. department of Transportation, Federal Highway Administration, Chapter VII, Safety.
 The U.S. Department of Transportation's Western Uniformity Scenario Analysis.
 British Columbia Government Licensing Bulletin 6
 British Columbia Government Licensing Bulletin 41
 Roadmap of technologies able to halve energy use per passenger mile includes the dynamically coupled, heterogeneous type of roadtrain
 Road trains and electrification of transport
Combination Vehicles for Commercial Drivers License

Trucks
Trains
Train
Articulated vehicles
Train